The lens capsule is a component of the globe of the eye. It is a clear elastic basement membrane composed of collagen IV laminin etc  a quality that keeps it under constant tension.  As a result, the lens naturally tends towards a rounder or more globular configuration, a shape it must assume for the eye to focus at a near distance. The lens capsule is the thickest basement membrane in the body.

Normally, the lens capsule serves as a diffusion barrier. It is permeable to low molecular weight compounds but restricts the movement of large colloidal particles.

Anatomy
The lens capsule is a transparent membrane that surrounds the entire lens. The capsule is thinnest at the posterior pole with approximate thickness of 3.5μm. Average thickness at the equator is 7μm. Anterior pole thickness increases with age from 11-15μm. The thickest portion of is annular region surrounding the anterior pole. This will also increases with age (from 13.5-16μm). The ligaments suspending the lens form attachments in the equatorial area and more so just to the front and back of the equator. There are tens of thousands of these ligaments in a mouse lens and for the most part they appear to connect directly to the lens capsule. As the lens grows throughout the life of most vertebrates the capsule is required to grow as well. Some ligament anchors have associated cells where they connect to the lens capsule with periodic cellular processes penetrating the capsule itself. The structures in the images are consistent with the laying down of new capsular material required for growth. Even though the capsule is a highly elastic structure, it contains no elastic fibers. Elasticity is because of the thick lamellar arrangement of the collagen fibers.

Function
The capsule helps give the lens its more spherical shape in aquatic vertebrates such as fish and more ellipsoidal shape in land based vertebrates such as sheep. In humans the lens ellipsoid becomes more flattened with age. The capsule is the basement membrane for the epithelial cells at the front of the lens and the rapidly growing more flexible fiber cells of the back of the lens and below the epithelium at the front. Without the capsule substrate forming a tense support these cells loose their form as in the picture of a decapsulated sheep lens.

Accommodation

Normally, when ciliary muscles are in a relaxed state, the zonules will pull the capsule. Due to this zonular tension anterior lens surface is flatter resulting in more distant objects being in focus. When ciliary muscles contract, the zonular tension will reduce allowing lens to assume more spherical shape. This shape change increases the focusing power of the eye allowing closer objects to come into focus. The process of changing the lens's focusing power to see closer objects more clearly is known as accommodation.

Embryology

The lens vesicle is developed from surface ectoderm. It will separate from surface ectoderm at approximately day 33 in a human and only 3 days for a chicken. Lens capsule developed from basal lamina of lens vesicle will cover early lens fibers. Capsule is evident at 5 weeks of human gestation and begins its role in protecting and supporting the lens interior.

Lens protection
Early embryologic development of lens capsule give lens material an immune privilege. It will also help protect the lens from virus, bacteria and parasites.

Vascular lens capsule
During fetal development vascular lens capsule (tunica vasculosa lentis) develops from the mesenchyme that surrounds the lens. It receives arterial blood supply from the hyaloid artery. This blood supply slowly regress and vascular capsule disappear before birth. The disappearance of the anterior vascular capsule of the lens is useful in estimating the gestational age.

Clinical significance
In intra-capsular cataract extraction (ICCE), whole lens including the anterior part of the capsule is removed. During more common extra capsular cataract surgery procedures like micro incision cataract surgery, phacoemulsification etc., clouded lens is removed through opening made in anterior lens capsule. The intraocular lens is then inserted into the lens capsule which is capable of rapid healing. The best place for intraocular lens implantation is within the capsular bag.

Posterior capsular opacification and posterior capsule rupture are common complications of cataract surgery.

See also
 Lens (anatomy)

References

Human eye anatomy